Javier Hernán Klimowicz Laganá (born 10 March 1977) is a former Argentine-born Ecuadorian footballer who played as a  goalkeeper.

Klimowicz started his playing career in 1998 with Instituto de Córdoba and made his official debut in the Argentine Primera División on 9 April 2000, in a draw against Ferro Carril Oeste. In 2002, he signed with Bolivian team Blooming before moving to Ecuador to join Deportivo Cuenca in 2004. For the season 2009, he transferred to popular club CS Emelec.

He has been naturalised and capped for Ecuador's national team. He has started some matches as Ecuador's starting goalkeeper.

Personal life
He is the brother of forwards Diego and Nicolás, and uncle to midfielder Mateo. The Klimowicz family is of Polish and Ukrainian descent.

Honours

Club
 Deportivo Cuenca
 Serie A de Ecuador: 2004

References

External links
  
 
 
 
 

1977 births
Living people
Argentine emigrants to Ecuador
Naturalized citizens of Ecuador
People from Quilmes
Sportspeople from Buenos Aires Province
Argentine footballers
Ecuadorian footballers
Ecuador international footballers
Primera Nacional players
Ecuadorian Serie A players
Instituto footballers
Club Blooming players
C.D. Cuenca footballers
C.S. Emelec footballers
Association football goalkeepers
Expatriate footballers in Bolivia
Argentine expatriate sportspeople in Bolivia
Expatriate footballers in Ecuador
Argentine people of Polish descent
Argentine people of Ukrainian descent
Ecuadorian people of Polish descent